Niegosławice ; is a village in Żagań County, Lubusz Voivodeship, in western Poland. It is the seat of the gmina (administrative district) called Gmina Niegosławice.

The village has a population of 930.

Notable residents
 Günter Blobel (1936–2018), Nobel Prize-winning German biologist

References

Villages in Żagań County